Lambton Colliery Railway No. 29 is a preserved 0-6-2 steam tank locomotive built by Kitson and Company for the Lambton Colliery network in 1904. It was the first 0-6-2T to be employed on that system and was later joined by No. 5. No. 29 was designed to work between Philadelphia and Sunderland. In February 1969, No. 29 was withdrawn from service and put into dead storage. The following year, the locomotive was purchased by volunteers from the North Yorkshire Moors Railway and it was restored to working order. Ever since then, the locomotive has been operating on the NYMR, it is still operational as of 2023.

History

Original service life 
The Lambton  Colliery was a privately owned colliery, in County Durham, England. In the early 1900s, the railway approached a need for larger and more powerful locomotives than their existing 0-6-0 tender locomotives from the 1850s, so in 1904, they approached Kitson and Company in Leeds, West Yorkshire, and they purchased their first 0-6-2 tank locomotive, which was No. 29. 0-6-2 tank locomotives were very recently introduced and proven their worth in hauling coal loads. With a tractive force of 23,500 pounds, as well as a boiler pressure of 165 pounds per square inch, the LCR decided to purchase two identical copies of the locomotive to their roster in 1907, Nos 30 and 31. In 1909, two more 0-6-2s were delivered to the LCR, Nos 5 and 10, but this time, by Robert Stephenson and Company with a slightly different design. Only two more 0-6-2s followed for the railway in 1920 and 1934, Nos 42 and 57. Some Ex Taff Vale Great Western Railway 0-6-2s would also soon follow.

No. 29 and its classmates were used for shunting and pulling wagon loads of coal on LCR's rail lines, particularly between the pitheads near Philadelphia and the quayside coal staithes at Sunderland. In the late 1950s, however, (Under the ownership of the NCB) the Durham Coal field was being wound down, and a further spate of closures occurred in 1967 with Lambton Staithes being closed in January and the line to Pallion closing in August of the same year. The following year, The National Coal Board (NCB) was making steps to transition to diesel power, thus making the steam locomotives redundant even in the smaller railways of the country. In spite of an overhaul being completed in October 1968, No. 29 was withdrawn only three months later on the 15th February 1969, and it was subsequently stored in Philadelphia.

Preservation 

In January 1970 three volunteers went to Philadelphia to examine Nos 5 and 29 with a view to purchase them. All the other withdrawn locomotives remained inside Philadelphia Works, and during May, they were informed that their bids for Nos 5 and 29 had been successful, and so they commenced preparing them for their journey to the North Yorkshire Moors Railway. The initial plan was that the locomotive would be hauled by BR Class 46 diesel locomotive No. D186. However, the steam locomotive was allowed to propel the train to Thornaby, and when it arrived there, No. 29 was fitted with a London, Midland and Scottish-style vacuum braking system from an LMS Class 5 4-6-0, and the left leading axlebox was re-metalled. Then, BR Class 37 No. D6899 hauled No. 29, along with LNER Q6 No. 63395, from Thornaby to the NYMR's main location in Grosmont. Once under NYMR's ownership, No. 29 has been restored to working order, and since the railway's reopening on 1 May 1973, it has been hauling excursion trips on their rails, albeit with some overhauls along the way. It was also given the name Peggy. Having returned to steam after another overhaul for the 40th Anniversary of the NYMR in 2013, No. 29 has been in frequent use until October 2014, when a crack was discovered in her cylinder block, and it was withdrawn to wait for a replacement block. Yet, another overhaul was completed in July 2019 for the Annual Steam Gala. In July 2021, No. 29 made an appearance at the Didcot Railway Centre in Didcot, Oxfordshire for that year's Diamond Jubilee Gala to celebrate the Great Western Society's 60th anniversary. It is still available for traffic as of 2023. It carries the LH&JC initials of the Lambton, Hetton and Joicey Colliery system, formed by various amalgamations in 1924.

See also 

 0-6-2
 Taff Vale Railway O1 class
Taff Vale Railway O2 class
 List of preserved British industrial steam locomotives

References

External links 

North Yorkshire Moors Railway website

Preserved steam locomotives of Great Britain
Standard gauge steam locomotives of Great Britain
Tank locomotives
Railway locomotives introduced in 1904
North Yorkshire Moors Railway
Kitson locomotives
0-6-2T locomotives